The following is a list of the Departments of Homeland Security by state in the United States.

See also
Office of Emergency Management

References

External links
 State Homeland Security Contacts, United States Department of Homeland Security

States
State departments of homeland security of the United States